Meet Me at Midnite is the thirteenth solo album by Maria Muldaur, released August 30, 1994. This album was nominated for the W.C. Handy Blues Award in 1994.

Critical reception

Thom Jurek of AllMusic concludes his review with, "Meet Me at Midnite is one of those overlooked gems that got a second life. It's one of her strongest recordings; don't miss it."

Geoffrey Himes of The Washington Post writes, "Muldaur has a smokey voice and a slippery sense of phrasing that make Meet Me at Midnite a satisfying return to '70s-style roots-rock."

Track listing

Musicians
Maria Muldaur – Vocals
James Hutchinson – Bass (tracks 1, 2, 4, 5, 7 to 10, 12)
Larry Fulcher – Bass (tracks 3, 6)
Tony Braunagel – Drums, Percussion (track 1 to 10, 12)
Johnny Lee Schell – Guitar (tracks 1 to 8, 12)
Jon Woodhead – Guitar (tracks 5, 7, 10)
John Porter – Dobro (tracks 12), Guitar (tracks 1, 9)
Rick Vito – Slide Guitar (tracks 2, 6, 10)
Bill Payne – Organ (tracks 5, 7), Piano (tracks 1, 4, 9)
Tommy Eyre – Organ (tracks 2, 9)
Marty Grebb – Piano (tracks 2, 3, 5, 7, 8, 12), Bariton Saxophone (tracks 1, 4, 5, 8, 9), Tenor Saxophone (track 5), Organ (tracks 4, 6, 10), Marty Grebb – Accordion (track 12)
Joe Sublett – Tenor Saxophone (tracks 1, 4, 5, 8, 9)
Darrell Leonard – Trumpet (tracks 1, 4, 5, 8, 9)
Don Bryant – Background Vocals
Dianne Carter – Background Vocals
Dee Dee Dickerson – Background Vocals
Mike Finnegan – Background Vocals
Donny Gerrard – Background Vocals
Charles Lovett – Background Vocals
Shaun Murphy – Background Vocals
Tracy Nelson – Background Vocals
Ann Peebles – Background Vocals
Becky Russell – Background Vocals
Rugenia Faith Taylor – Background Vocals
Vaneta Thompson – Background Vocals
Darrell Leonard – Trumpet

Production
John Porter – Producer
Jeff Palo – Producer
Hammond Scott – Executive Producer
Nauman Scott – Executive Producer
Joe McGrath – Engineer
Jerry Finn – Assistant Engineer, Engineer
Matt Pakucko – Assistant Engineer, Engineer
Rich Veltrop – Assistant Engineer, Engineer
Andrew Warwick – Assistant Engineer, Engineer
Shane Mooney – Editorial Supervision
Derek Dressler – Project Assistant
Ted Myers – Project Assistant
Recorded at Red Zone Studios, Burbank, CA.
Additional recording at Chapel Studio, Encino, CA & Kiva Studio, Memphis, TN.

Track information and credits verified from the album's liner notes. Some information was adapted from 45Worlds and AllMusic.

References

External links
Maria Muldaur Official website

1994 albums
Maria Muldaur albums